The Cuba men's national field hockey team represent Cuba in international field hockey competitions.

Tournament record

Summer Olympics
 1980 – 5th place

World Cup
 2002 – 16th place

Pan American Games
 1979 – 4th place
 1983 – 6th place
 1991 – 6th place
 1995 – 4th place
 1999 – 
 2003 – 
 2007 – 5th place
 2011 – 4th place
 2015 – 8th place
 2019 – 6th place

Pan American Cup
2000 – 
2004 – Withdrew

Central American and Caribbean Games
 1982 – 
 1986 – 
 1990 – 
 1993 – 
 1998 – 
 2006 – 
 2014 – 
 2018 – 
 2023 – Qualified

Friendship Games
 1984 – 5th place

Alba Games
 2007 –

See also
Cuba women's national field hockey team

References

Cuba
Field Hockey
national team
Men's sport in Cuba